Mduduzi Mdantsane (born 13 December 1994) is a South African soccer player who plays as a midfielder for South African Premier Division side Cape Town City.

International career
He made his debut for South Africa national soccer team on 11 November 2021 in a World Cup qualifier against Zimbabwe.

References

Living people
1994 births
People from Gert Sibande District Municipality
Sportspeople from Mpumalanga
South African soccer players
South Africa international soccer players
Association football midfielders
Cape Town City F.C. (2016) players
South African Premier Division players